Merced Solis (born May 10, 1953), better known by the ring name Tito Santana, is a retired American professional wrestler and middle school teacher.

Santana has stayed a babyface his entire career and he is best known for his appearances with the World Wrestling Federation between 1979 and 1993 (missing part of 1980 and returning in 1983) where he was twice the WWF Intercontinental Heavyweight Champion and twice held the WWF Tag Team Championship. He also won the 1989 King of the Ring tournament and wrestled at all of the first nine WrestleMania events, as well as helping bridge the gap between the 1980s "Rock 'n Wrestling Connection" era to the 1990s "New Generation" era.

Santana was inducted into the WWE Hall of Fame class of 2004. During his time in the WWF, Santana, despite being born and raised in Texas, was billed from "Tocula, Mexico", which may be a misspelled reference to the city of Toluca. To this day, he still appears on the independent circuit.

Collegiate and professional football career 
Solis attended West Texas State University, where he was a member of the Lambda Chi Alpha fraternity. Solis played tight end for the West Texas State Buffaloes. The team was quarterbacked by future professional wrestler Tully Blanchard, who would introduce Solis to the world of professional wrestling. After graduating, Solis was signed by the Kansas City Chiefs but cut during training camp, due to a poor performance in the 40-yard dash because of a twisted Achilles tendon two weeks before camp. He played a single season for the BC Lions of the Canadian Football League, appearing in 13 regular season games.

Professional wrestling career

Early career (1977–1979) 
After training under Hiro Matsuda and Bob Orton, Solis made his professional wrestling debut on February 23, 1977, for Championship Wrestling from Florida, losing to Crusher Verdu. In April, he joined Georgia Championship Wrestling (GCW) where he adopted the name "Richard Blood". In January 1978, he moved onto Mid Atlantic Championship Wrestling where he wrestled for a calendar year, he also toured with All Japan Pro Wrestling in October and early November. Reverting to his real name, Solis joined Western States Sports in 1979, winning the NWA Western States Tag Team Championship with Ted DiBiase.

World Wrestling Federation (1979–1980) 
Santana joined the World Wrestling Federation defeating Mike Hall in his debut match on Championship Wrestling in 1979. He teamed with Ivan Putski to defeat Johnny Valiant and Jerry Valiant for the World Tag Team Championship WWF Tag Team Championship at Madison Square Garden in October 1979. The duo held the titles for close to six months before losing to the Wild Samoans in April 1980. Santana left the WWF soon after, joining New Japan Pro-Wrestling for a two-month tour.

American Wrestling Association (1980–1982) 
Santana wrestled in the American Wrestling Association (AWA) from 1980 to 1982. Matches he had in the AWA include two matches he had against Nick Bockwinkel in St Paul, Minnesota, on March 1, 1981, and in Winnipeg, Manitoba, on May 13, 1982 (Bockwinkel won both matches by cheating). Santana teamed with future tag team partner Rick Martel against the High Flyers on August 29, 1982, in St Paul Minnesota. Santana and Martel lost the match.

Georgia Championship Wrestling (1982–1983) 
Santana returned to GCW in July 1982. He teamed with Terry Gordy to unsuccessfully challenge The Samoans (Afa and Sika) for the NWA National Tag Team Championship on two occasions. On April 2, 1983, Santana also fought Larry Zbyszko for the NWA National Heavyweight Championship in a losing effort.

Return to WWF (1983–1993)

Intercontinental Heavyweight champion (1983–1987) 
Santana returned to the WWF in 1983, making his televised return on the May 14 episode of Championship Wrestling by defeating José Estrada. Being brought in for TV tapings only, Santana continued to wrestle for GCW until July when he signed for the WWF full time. In 1984, Santana fought the Iron Sheik to a double-disqualification for the WWF World Heavyweight Championship at the Philadelphia Spectrum. He then engaged in a lengthy feud with WWF Intercontinental Heavyweight champion, the Magnificent Muraco. Santana finally won the title on February 11, 1984, becoming the first Mexican-American wrestler to win the Intercontinental Heavyweight Championship. After successfully defending the Intercontinental Heavyweight Championship against Muraco, Santana was targeted by Greg "the Hammer" Valentine, and in September 1984 in London, Ontario, Canada, Valentine defeated Santana to win the title. Soon after, the storyline had Valentine injuring Santana's knee and putting Santana out of action for several months. Santana returned in December 1984 and set his sights on getting the Intercontinental title back from Valentine. During this time, he started using Valentine's finishing hold, the figure-four leglock and also wrestled in tag-team competition with Blackjack Mulligan. Santana wrestled at the first WrestleMania, at Madison Square Garden, in March 1985, and in the opening match defeated a masked wrestler known as the Executioner ("Playboy" Buddy Rose), making him submit to the figure four in 4:05. Santana made an appearance in the ring later in the card during the Intercontinental Heavyweight Championship match between Valentine and Santana's friend the Junkyard Dog. Wearing street clothes, Santana rushed to the ring to inform referee Dick Kroll that Valentine had used his feet on the ropes to help pin the JYD. Despite having already called for the bell, Kroll restarted the match and an incensed Valentine was counted out as he did not get back into the ring to continue.

On Right After Wrestling, hosted by Arda Ocal and Jimmy Korderas, Santana stated that he was somewhat disappointed with being in the first match at the original WrestleMania in 1985. He also said that Vince McMahon later told Santana that his reason for putting him in the opening match was to kick the show off with a quality match, something he knew Santana, as a solid fan-favorite and former Intercontinental champion, would produce. Santana and Valentine went on to wrestle a memorable series of singles and tag team matches with neither gaining the upper hand. They wrestled in a variety of different types of matches such as regular title matches, no disqualification matches, and lumberjack matches. The pair also faced off in tag team competition with Santana teaming with the Junkyard Dog and Valentine teaming with Brutus Beefcake in a team that would become known as the Dream Team. Santana recaptured the Intercontinental Heavyweight Championship from Valentine in a brutal steel cage match in Baltimore on July 6, 1985. After the match, Valentine, incensed over losing the belt, destroyed it by repeatedly bashing it against the steel cage, forcing the WWF to get a new Intercontinental Heavyweight Championship belt. In reality however, the WWF had made a new Intercontinental Heavyweight Championship belt to go along with the new image they were trying to promote and smashing the old championship belt was seen as a way of moving forward with Santana having the honor of being the first to wear the new title belt. Santana would hold on to the title until February 8, 1986, when he lost it to "Macho Man" Randy Savage at the Boston Garden, after Savage knocked him out with a foreign object he had hidden in his tights that supposedly went unnoticed by referee Danny Davis.

Although Santana lost the Intercontinental title before the WWF's storyline that Davis was a corrupt official who clearly favored the heels, the WWF used Santana losing the belt because of Davis' bias to include him in a six-man tag team match at WrestleMania III on March 29, 1987, where he teamed with the British Bulldogs (Dynamite Kid and Davey Boy Smith) against the WWF tag team champions the Hart Foundation (Bret "Hitman" Hart and Jim "the Anvil" Neidhart) and their new partner, former referee "Dangerous" Danny Davis (who had previously wrestled for the WWF as a masked jobber named "Mr. X"). Davis had also been the assigned referee when the Harts stole the WWF Tag Team Championship from the Bulldogs in January 1987, allowing the Harts to double team Davey Boy throughout the entire match after their manager "the Mouth of the South" Jimmy Hart had knocked Dynamite out with his megaphone. The story for WrestleMania III being that the Bulldogs and Santana wanted revenge on Davis as the one responsible for losing their respective titles. The Harts and Davis won the match when Davis used Jimmy Hart's megaphone to 'knock out' and pin Smith. Santana made a second appearance during Wrestlemania III when he came to the ring and attacked manager Slick after his man "the Natural" Butch Reed had defeated Koko B. Ware. Santana, in response to previous attacks by Slick, tore the clothing from Slick who managed to scamper back to the locker room with his suit in tatters. Following this, Reed entered the ring to fight off Santana but was sent from the ring by a double dropkick from Santana and Ware.

Strike Force (1987–1989) 

Santana formed the popular tag team Strike Force with Canadian Rick Martel in August 1987. They defeated The Hart Foundation for the WWF Tag Team championship on a televised edition of WWF Superstars of Wrestling when Martel made Jim Neidhart submit to a Boston crab. Strike Force held them for five months before losing to Demolition at Wrestlemania IV. Due to a neck injury inflicted on Martel (kayfabe) shortly after the loss, the team was inactive for several months (in reality, Martel was granted leave to tend to his wife who was seriously ill). Immediately after the injury, Santana introduced a new tag team to the WWF, The Powers of Pain (The Barbarian and The Warlord), two big, muscled up power wrestlers whom he briefly managed. The Powers were introduced as mercenaries to help Martel and Santana gain revenge on Demolition for both the title loss and the injury to Martel. The Powers would later find more permanent management with The Baron before finally turning heel at the 1988 Survivor Series by stealing away Demolition's manager Mr. Fuji, leaving the champions as babyfaces.

Martel returned at the Royal Rumble in 1989 and reunited with Santana. However, in their WrestleMania V match against The Brain Busters (Tully Blanchard and Arn Anderson), Martel turned on Santana during the match after accidentally being hit by Santana's Flying forearm smash. Martel refused to tag in and walked back to the dressing room leaving Santana to face both opponents alone (the Busters then easily defeated Tito with a Spike piledriver). In an interview with "Mean" Gene Okerlund immediately following the match, Martel called Santana a loser and said he was sick and tired of carrying him. His feud with the newly heel Martel would last throughout 1989, with both men on opposing teams at both SummerSlam and Survivor Series and Santana defeating Martel in the finals of the 1989 King of the Ring tournament. Santana even allied with his former archenemies Demolition against Martel, defeating him and The Fabulous Rougeaus in a six-man tag match on June 22, 1989, in Hartford, Connecticut.

Intercontinental Heavyweight championship pursuits (1990–1991) 
After The Ultimate Warrior won the WWF World Heavyweight Championship from Hulk Hogan at WrestleMania VI and vacated the Intercontinental Heavyweight Championship, Santana took part in an eight-man tournament to name a new Intercontinental Champion. Santana made it to the finals, where he lost to Mr. Perfect. Following that loss, Santana occasionally teamed with Koko B. Ware. At the 1990 Survivor Series, he teamed with Nikolai Volkoff and The Bushwhackers (Luke and Butch). He was the winner and sole survivor in the elimination-style match against Sgt. Slaughter, Boris Zhukov, and The Orient Express (Sato and Tanaka). As a result, Santana advanced to the final elimination match, teaming with Hulk Hogan and The Ultimate Warrior against Martel, "The Million Dollar Man" Ted DiBiase, The Warlord, and Power and Glory (Hercules and Paul Roma). Santana would eliminate The Warlord with his Flying forearm before being pinned by DiBiase. Santana would then wrestle at WrestleMania VII, losing to The Mountie in a little over a minute after being hit in the stomach by The Mountie's electrified cattle prod.

El Matador (1991–1993) 
Later in 1991, Santana adopted a Spanish bullfighter gimmick and the nickname "El Matador" after he returned to the WWF. His first WrestleMania match under this gimmick is when he faced and lost to Shawn Michaels in the opening bout of WrestleMania VIII at the Hoosier Dome in Indianapolis. Santana claims that at the time he was being considered for a run with the WWF World Heavyweight Championship, but says that the spot was given to Bret Hart; the WWF was considering expanding into Central America and South America and felt that having Santana, its most high-profile Latino wrestler, as champion would aid its cause. The plan was eventually scrapped and the decision was made to expand into Canada and Europe, thus making the Canadian-born Hart a more viable option as champion. In any case, Santana wrestled under the "El Matador" gimmick through 1993, mostly wrestling jobbers, while losing most matches to higher talent. This included a dark match loss to Papa Shango at SummerSlam which was held at the Wembley Stadium in London, England. Santana defeated friend and frequent tag team partner Virgil on a 1993 episode of Wrestling Challenge. As a sign of mutual respect between the two, both men embraced after the match. He stopped appearing on WWF programming in North America, but he continued working on the WWF Summer tour in Europe and the international house show circuit through the course of August–September. Santana, along with only Hulk Hogan, holds the unique distinction of appearing in the first nine WrestleManias, accumulating a 2–7 record during that time. Officially he is recognized only for the first eight WrestleManias matches. In his final in-ring WrestleMania appearance, he defeated Papa Shango at WrestleMania IX in the untelevised opening match called another dark match. Because of this he is later recognized as having a 1–7 record. Unfortunately for Santana, despite regaining the IC title from Greg Valentine later in 1985, and two years later winning the Tag Team title with Rick Martel as part of Strike Force, he would never again win a televised match at a WrestleMania event. Santana continued to wrestle through the first half of 1993 following WrestleMania IX, facing Razor Ramon, Adam Bomb, and Papa Shango. His final match was on August 13, 1993, in Wildwood, New Jersey, when he defeated Damien Demento.

International World Class Championship Wrestling (1991, 1994–1995) 
While taking a short hiatus from the World Wrestling Federation, he wrestled in International World Class Championship Wrestling (IWCCW) briefly where he held a feud with Tony Atlas. On an IWCCW card in Brooklyn, New York, Atlas defeated Dusty Wolfe. After the bout, he openly challenged any of his fellow wrestlers to try to beat him. Santana immediately responded, charging out and dropkicking Atlas out of the ring. Following the event, Santana and Atlas scheduled a match for June 15 in Nassau in The Bahamas for the IWCCW title, where Santana sought to avenge his former tag team partner "Polish Power" Ivan Putski, whom Atlas had hung over the ropes previously. Santana had the upper hand in the bout until Atlas' manager Tony Rumble interfered by distracting and enraging Santana by repeatedly putting Atlas' foot on the rope. Santana then went after Rumble, pulled him onto the ring apron, and knocked him onto the floor. Atlas took the opportunity to blindside Santana with a pair of brass knuckles from behind. The referee saw this illegal attack, and disqualified Atlas.

Return and IWCCW Heavyweight Champion 
After leaving ECW in 1993, Santana returned to IWCCW in 1994 where he wrestled some of his old WWF rivals such as Hercules Hernandez, Rick Martel, and Greg Valentine. During his second stint, he won the vacant IWCCW Heavyweight Championship (a title which had been vacated by Tony Atlas a man Santana first feuded with during his first stint in IWCCW back in 1991, Tony Atlas had left IWCCW for World Championship Wrestling (WCW) back in 1992) with a tournament victory over Greg Valentine who later claimed the title in a rematch. In IWCCW Santana resumed his feuds from the WWF with Rick Martel and Greg Valentine, and again wrestled Tony Atlas, who defeated him in a match in Yardville, New Jersey. Santana also feuded with Manny Fernandez, as Fernandez had attacked Santana after Santana had defeated L.A. Gore. After Valentine had defeated Santana for the title, Santana also then had later agreed to an interfederation title vs title match with Valentine as Santana had won the AWF championship while he was still competing in IWCCW.

NWA Eastern Championship Wrestling (1993)
Santana played a role in the formative years of ECW. Then known as Eastern Championship Wrestling, he won the ECW Heavyweight Championship on August 8, 1993, by defeating former WWF rival Don Muraco, but forfeited the championship later that year to Shane Douglas.

American Wrestling Federation (1994–1996) 
During 1994 and 1996 Santana wrestled in the short-lived American Wrestling Federation (AWF). He was both the first and last AWF Heavyweight Champion, defeating Bob Orton, Jr. in a tournament final for the inaugural belt in November 1994, and losing and regaining the title from Orton on the same night in October 1996. Santana was slightly considered the top babyface of the company, and its major champion along with Orton (who was the top heel)

Second return to the WWF (1997–1998)
Santana returned to the WWF as a commentator in the Spanish Broadcast table, He called on Monday Night Raw, as well as PPV events, he was last doing Spanish commentary at WrestleMania XIV. In November 1997, he made on-air appearances as El Matador in the Karate Fighters Holiday Tournament, facing Carlos Cabrera and Jerry Lawler.

Regional Championship Wrestling (1997–2013) 
On July 19, 1997, Santana lost by disqualification to "Playboy" Jonathon Luvstruk w/Bodacious Pretty Boy in the finals of the United States title tournament at RCW's Battleground event. On August 8, 2009, Santana defeated Jerome Hendrix at RCW's Rumblemania 6 event. On May 6, 2012, Santana defeated Tokyo Dragon w/Rich Rogers in tournament final to become RCW champion at RCW's Rumblemania 8 event. On May 10, 2013, Santana and Tokyo Dragon defeated Mad Russian, Jack Molson and Rich Rogers in a title vs. hair match. Santana cut Rogers's hair at RCW's Megabrawl 6 event.

World Championship Wrestling (2000) 
On January 10, 2000, Santana made a one-time appearance in WCW. He defeated Jeff Jarrett in a Dungeon match on Nitro.

Independent circuit (1996–present) 
Since 1996, Santana continues to make appearances on the independent circuit. On December 7, 1996, he defeated former WWF rival Bob Orton Jr. to win the USA Pro Heavyweight title. He would hold the title until March 11, 1999, when he left the promotion. On March 13, 2004, he was inducted to the WWE Hall of Fame class of 2004, with an induction speech by his WrestleMania VIII opponent Shawn Michaels. In September 2008, he was inducted into the Spanish Hall of Fame of Pro Wrestling (Salón del Catch). He defeated his former rival Greg Valentine for the IWA Heavyweight Championship at WreslteReunion 2 on August 27, 2005. A few weeks later he dropped the title back to Valentine. On the November 15, 2010 "Old School" episode of Raw, he ring-announced Alberto Del Rio. Santana later appeared in the "Legends Roll-On" On April 14, 2012, he made an appearance wrestling a match for Pro Wrestling Superstars against Shawn Spears defeating him with an inside cradle. In July 2012, Santana wrestled in Winnipeg MB for Canadian Westling Elite against Matt Fairlane, but was disqualified due to outside interference. He also embarked on a three-day tour of Saskatchewan, Canada with High Impact Wrestling Canada. He wrestled and defeated Jumpin' Joe by pinfall in Yorkton, SK on July 16, lost by disqualification to Rex Roberts at Pile O' Bones Rumble XVII on July 17, and then on July 18 defeated King Kash by pinfall. On September 14, 2012, Santana made an unadvertised appearance for Chikara, when he entered the 2012 King of Trios tournament, teaming with Mihara and The Mysterious and Handsome Stranger, with the three losing to the Spectral Envoy (Frightmare, Hallowicked and UltraMantis Black) in their first round match. On December 4, 2012, the Professional Wrestling Hall of Fame and Museum announced Santana would be inducted into their Modern Category. The PWHF Induction took place on May 18, 2013. On April 19, 2014, Santana competed in a match with "The German Menace" Kraig Stagg on ECPW's iPPV "Super Showcase Saturday". Recently on November 25, 2022 Sanatna defeated This Guy (Johnny Della Rocka) for BCW 49 in East Burwood, Victoria, Australia.

Personal life
While attending West Texas A&M University, Solis was a member of Lambda Chi Alpha fraternity. He has been a Spanish teacher at Eisenhower Middle School in Roxbury Township, New Jersey, where he lives with his wife and their three sons; his wife operated a hair salon in Succasunna-Kenvil, New Jersey until January 2022. He also teaches wrestling classes at the New Jersey-based Independent Wrestling Federation. He was also a physical education teacher for Smalley Elementary School in Bound Brook, New Jersey. His autobiography, Tito Santana's Tales From the Ring, was released in 2008.

Championships and accomplishments
American Wrestling Federation
AWF Heavyweight Championship (2 times)
AWF Heavyweight Title Tournament (1994)
Empire Wrestling Alliance
EWA Heavyweight Championship (1 time)
Eastern Championship Wrestling
ECW Heavyweight Championship (1 time)
House of Pain Wrestling Federation
HoPWF Tag Team Championship (1 time)
Independent Association of Wrestling
IAW Television Championship (1 time)
Independent Wrestling Federation
IWF Tag Team Championship – with Biggie Biggs (1 Time)
Royal Rumble (2016)
International Association of Wrestling
IAW Television Championship (1 time)
International World Class Championship Wrestling
IWCCW Heavyweight Championship (1 time)
NWA Western States Sports
NWA Western States Tag Team Championship (1 time) – with Ted DiBiase
National Wrestling Alliance
Houston Wrestling Gold Cup Tournament (1981)
National Wrestling Council
NWC Heavyweight Championship (1 time)
New England Pro Wrestling Hall of Fame
Class of 2011
Northern States Wrestling Alliance
NSWA Heavyweight Championship (1 time)
Professional Wrestling Hall of Fame
Class of 2013
Pro Wrestling Illustrated
PWI Tag Team of the Year award in 1979 – with Ivan Putski.
PWI ranked him # 51 of the 500 best singles wrestlers in the PWI 500 in 1995.
PWI ranked him # 93 of the 500 best singles wrestlers during the PWI Years in 2003.
PWI ranked him # 70 of the 100 best tag teams during the PWI Years with Rick Martel in 2003.
PWI ranked him # 92 of the 100 best tag teams during the PWI Years with Ivan Putski in 2003.
Renegade Wrestling Alliance
RWA Heavyweight Championship (1 time)
 USA Pro Wrestling
USA Pro Heavyweight Championship (1 time)
Unified Championship Wrestling
UCW Heavyweight Championship (1 time)
Universal Superstars of America
USA Tag Team Championship (1 time) – with Chris Michaels
World-1
W1 Tag Team Championship (1 time) – with Travis Lee
World Wrestling Federation/Entertainment
WWF Intercontinental Heavyweight Championship (2 times)
WWF Tag Team Championship (2 times) – with Ivan Putski (1), and Rick Martel (1)
King of the Ring (1989)
WWE Hall of Fame (Class of 2004)
Rio Grande Valley Sports Hall of Fame
Class of 2007
Other titles
CWA Heavyweight Championship (1 Time)
GWA Heavyweight Championship (1 Time)
USA Heavyweight Championship (1 Time)
UWS Tag Team Championship (1 Time)
IWA Heavyweight Championship (1 Time)

References

External links

 
 
 

1953 births
20th-century professional wrestlers
21st-century professional wrestlers
American football tight ends
American male professional wrestlers
American professional wrestlers of Mexican descent
BC Lions players
ECW Heavyweight Champions/ECW World Heavyweight Champions
Educators from Texas
Hispanic and Latino American teachers
ICW/IWCCW Heavyweight Champions
Kansas City Chiefs players
Living people
People from Mission, Texas
Professional wrestlers from Texas
Professional Wrestling Hall of Fame and Museum
Stampede Wrestling alumni
West Texas A&M Buffaloes football players
WWE Hall of Fame inductees
WWF/WWE Intercontinental Champions
WWF/WWE King Crown's Champions/King of the Ring winners